The 1978 Roller Hockey World Cup was the twenty-third roller hockey world cup, organized by the Fédération Internationale de Roller Sports. It was contested by 12 national teams (5 from Europe, 3 from South America, 1 from North America, 1 from Africa, 1 from Asia and 1 from Oceania). All the games were played in the Estadio Aldo Cantoni, in the city of San Juan, in Argentina, the chosen city to host the World Cup.

Venue

Results

Standings

See also
 FIRS Roller Hockey World Cup

External links
 1978 World Cup in rink-hockey.net historical database

Roller Hockey World Cup
1978 in Argentine sport
1978 in roller hockey
International roller hockey competitions hosted by Argentina